James Aloysius Finnegan (December 20, 1906 – March 26, 1958) was a Democratic politician from Philadelphia, Pennsylvania. He was graduated from the University of Pennsylvania in 1931, and then served the United States Air Force as Lieutenant Colonel in the Troop Carrier Command in the United States, England, and France from 1942–46.

Finnegan served in succession as Secretary of the Delaware River Navigation Commission under Governor George Earle, administrative assistant to Senator Francis Myers, administrative assistant to former Congressman Mike Bradley, and chair of the Philadelphia County Democratic Executive Committee. A member of Philadelphia City Council, he was elected its president in 1951, serving until January 1955.

Finnegan became Secretary of the Commonwealth under Governor George Leader in 1955. He resigned the position that same year to assume the duties of campaign manager for Illinois Governor Adlai E. Stevenson's pre-convention and later presidential campaign in 1956. Leader reappointed Finnegan Secretary of the Commonwealth on December 28, 1956. He served in this capacity until his death, at age 52, on March 26, 1958.

Pennsylvania political leaders at the time of Finnegan's demise created the Finnegan Foundation.  The foundation's purpose is to provide educational fellowships to undergraduates.

References

Further reading
 Ralph G. Martin (1964), Ballots and Bandwagons, Chicago: Rand McNally, "Democratic National Convention of 1956", pp. 372–455.

1906 births
1958 deaths
Philadelphia City Council members
Secretaries of the Commonwealth of Pennsylvania
University of Pennsylvania alumni
Pennsylvania Democrats
20th-century American politicians